Killer Ability (Japanese: キラーアビリティ, foaled 27 January 2019) is a Japanese Thoroughbred racehorse. He was one of the best two-year-olds in Japan in 2021 when he won two of his four races including the Grade 1 Hopeful Stakes.

Background
Killer Ability is a brown colt with a white star and snip and white socks on his hind legs bred in Japan by Northern Farm. During his racing career he was trained by Takashi Saito and raced in the green, white and red colours of the Northern Farm associate Carrot Farm.

He was from the twelfth crop of foals sired by Deep Impact, who was the Japanese Horse of the Year in 2005 and 2006, winning races including the Tokyo Yushun, Tenno Sho, Arima Kinen and Japan Cup. Deep Impact's other progeny include Gentildonna, Loves Only You, Kizuna, A Shin Hikari, Contrail and Saxon Warrior. Killer Ability's dam Killer Graces was bred in Kentucky and raced with considerable success in the United States where she won three races including the Hollywood Starlet Stakes and ran second in the Breeders' Cup Filly & Mare Sprint. In November 2012 she was bought by Katsumi Yoshida and exported to Japan. She was descended from the American broodmare Regal Gleam who also produced Royal Glint and the dam of Caerleon.

Racing career

2021: two-year-old season
Killer Ability began his racing career in a contest for previously unraced juveniles over 1800 metres on firm ground at Tokyo Racecourse on 27 June 2021. Ridden by Christophe Lemaire he started the 2.9/1 second favourite but came home fifth of the eleven runners, three lengths behind the winner Red Belle Ame. Mirai Iwata was in the saddle two months later when the colt started 0.5/1 favourite for a maiden race over 2000 metres at Kokura Racecourse and scored his first success as he took the lead early in the straight and drew right away to win by seven lengths from Personal High in a record time of 1:59.5. Iwata took the ride again when Killer Ability was stepped up in class and started favourite for the Listed Hagi Stakes over 1800 metres at Hanshin on 30 October. He took the lead in the straight and looked the likely winner before being run down in the final strides and beaten a neck into second place by Danon Scorpion. His trainer commented "He was tense the whole time... he’s still immature and he has a somewhat difficult temperament".

On 28 December at Nakayama Racecourse, Killer Ability was stepped up to Grade 1 class to contest Hopeful Stakes over 2000 metres and went off the 2.1/1 second choice in the betting behind Command Line (winner of the Saudi Arabia Royal Cup) in a fifteen-runner field. Ridden by Takeshi Yokoyama he settled in third place behind Grand Line and Born This Way before switching to the outside approaching the final turn. He gained the advantage from Born This Way entering the last 200 metres and won by one and a half length with a length and a quarter back to Lagulf in third. After the race Yokoyama commented “Sitting in the saddle in his workouts two weeks in a row convinced me that he was going to run and run fast. We sat in a good position and when the colt was able to relax in the backstretch, I had all the confidence I needed that he was going to win. I’m sure he will go on to improve further and become stronger".

In the official Japanese rankings Killer Ability was rated the second-best two-year-old of 2021, one pound behind the top-rated Do Deuce. In January 2022, at the JRA Awards, Killer Ability finished second to Do Deuce in the poll to determine the Best Two-Year-Old Colt.

2022: three-year-old season
On his first appearance as a three-year-old Killer Ability started the 6.6/1 fourth favourite for the Satsuki Sho over 2000 metres at Hanshin Racecourse on 17 April. He started poorly before settling in mid-division and faded in the closing stages to come home thirteenth of the eighteen runners, beaten just over six lengths by the winner Geoglyph.

Pedigree

References

2019 racehorse births
Racehorses bred in Japan
Racehorses trained in Japan
Thoroughbred family 1-x